1st arrondissement may refer to:
 France
 1st arrondissement of Lyon
 1st arrondissement of Marseille
 1st arrondissement of Paris
 Benin
 1st arrondissement of Parakou
 1st arrondissement of Porto-Novo
 1st arrondissement of the Littoral Department

Arrondissement name disambiguation pages